Dayr Sunayd was a Palestinian Arab village in the Gaza Subdistrict, located  northeast of Gaza. Situated at an elevation of  along the southern coastal plain of Palestine, Deir Sunayd had a total land area of 6,081 dunams. Prior to its depopulation during the 1948 Arab–Israeli War, it had 730 inhabitants in 1945.

History
The first part of its name "Dayr" is Arabic for "Monastery", suggesting that it was once the site of a monastic order or a Christian population possibly resided there at one point of time. "Sunayd" was the name of an Arab tribe in the area.

Ottoman era
Under the Ottoman Empire, in the 1596 tax records, Dayr Sunayd was noted  in the nahiya of Gaza, part of Sanjak of Gaza,  with a population of 12 households, an estimated 66 persons, all Muslim. The villagers  paid a fixed tax rate of 33,3% on various agricultural products, including  wheat, barley, fruit, beehives and goats; a total of 4,600 akçe. 

The village appeared under the  name of Deir Esni on the map  that  Pierre Jacotin compiled in 1799.

In 1863, French explorer Victor Guérin  found the village, which he called Deir Essneid, to have 150 inhabitants. Its gardens were mainly planted with figs. An Ottoman  village list from about 1870 found that the village had  a population of 144, in a total of  51  houses, though the population count included men, only. 

In the late 19th century, Dayr Sunayd was a moderate-sized village that was rectangular in shape, split into four quadrants by two roads that crossed at right angles. It had adobe brick houses, eight wells, gardens, a pond, and at the center of the village was a mosque.

British Mandate era

In the 1922 census of Palestine, conducted by the  British Mandate authorities, Dair Sunait  had a population of 356 inhabitants, all Muslims, increasing in the 1931 census  to 475, still all Muslim, in  103 houses.

By the end of the British Mandate period, Dayr Sunayd had expanded west toward the coastal highway. A school was opened in 1945 with an enrollment of 63 students and a number of small shops were opened there as well. Agriculture was the primary source of income for most residents, followed by commerce.

In the 1945 statistics   Dayr Sunayd had a population of 730, all Muslims,  with a total of 6,081  dunams of land, according to an official land and population survey.  Of this, 158 dunams were used for citrus and bananas, 512 dunams were for plantations and irrigable land, 4,863  for cereals, while 13  dunams were built-up land.

1948 War and aftermath

The date on which Dayr Sunayd was captured during the 1948 Arab-Israeli War cannot be specified, but the village was probably seized by Israeli forces in late October or early November 1948. It had come under aerial bombardment in Operation Yoav on October 15–16, according to Israeli historian Benny Morris. The New York Times reported that it was "pummeled" again on October 21.

Dayr Sunayd also witnessed fighting in the early stages if the war, as Egyptian and Jewish forces battled for control of the village and the nearby town of Yad Mordechai shortly after May 15, 1948. The late president of Egypt, Gamal Abdel Nasser said that when spent the night at the Gaza Military Hospital, "the beds around me were filled with our wounded from the battle of Dayr Sunayd, which was still in progress". Abdel Nasser was critical of the Egyptian command's strategy at the battle, but nonetheless, it ended in an Egyptian victory "after heavy sacrifices and in spite of all the difficulties our forces encountered." Abdel Nasser's colleague Abdel Hakim Amer participated in the battle.

Following the war the area was incorporated into the State of Israel, with the village's lands left undeveloped. According to Palestinian historian Walid Khalidi, the remains of Dayr Sunayd consisted in 1992  of "A railroad bridge, unused segments of track, and three of the train station's buildings are all that remain of Dayr Sunayd. The stone bridge is built astride a wadi and passes over four wide, round-arched culverts. The station's buildings are deserted and in a state of deterioration."

See also
Depopulated Palestinian locations in Israel

References

Bibliography

 
 
    
 
 

 

Nasser, G.A. (1955/1973):  "Memoirs"in Journal of Palestine Studies 
 in 2, no. 2 (Win. 73): 3-32]

External links
Welcome To Dayr Sunayd
Dayr Sunayd, Zochrot
Survey of Western Palestine, Map 19:   IAA, Wikimedia commons 
Dayr Sunayd from the Khalil Sakakini Cultural Center

Arab villages depopulated during the 1948 Arab–Israeli War
District of Gaza